Attar is both an Arabic given name and a surname that refers to the occupations apothecary, pharmacist, spice dealer, or perfumer.

There is an exaggerated form related to this name, Atir or Ater (عاطِر ‘āṭir), meaning "perfumed, sweet-smelling, aromatic, fragrant", which is used rarely.

Both of these names are derived from the Arabic noun for perfume or fragrance, ittar (or attar).

Notable people with the name include:
Abbas Attar (born 1944), Iranian photographer and photojournalist known by the mononym Abbas 
Attar of Nishapur (c.1142–c.1220), Persian Sufi poet
Attar Singh, Fijian trade unionist of Indian descent
Bachir Attar (born 1964), leader of The Master Musicians of Jajouka
Chaim ibn Attar (1696–1743), Moroccan rabbi, Talmudist 
Muhammad Ilyas Attar Qadri (born 1950), Muslim scholar and spiritual leader
Muhammad Said al-Attar (1927–2005), acting Prime Minister of Yemen for five months in 1994
Najah al-Attar (born 1933), current Vice President of Syria 
Sibille Attar (born 1981), Swedish singer songwriter
Suad al-Attar (born 1942), renowned Iraqi painter
Zayn-e-Attar (died 1403), Persian physician

See also

Attar (disambiguation)

Arabic-language surnames